Comic Republic is a Nigerian online multimedia company that primarily focuses on the digital distribution of indigenously created comic books. The company features African people, locales and mythology in much of its published body of work, although this is not an explicitly stated focus of the company. Comic Republic's flagship character is Guardian Prime.

On 23 November 2016, Comic Republic was featured as an African Startup by CNN. In 2021, Comic Republic signed a deal to produce a film adaptation of their comic Ireti.

References

Comics publishing companies
Nigerian companies established in 2013
Nigerian comics